The Kansas Collegiate Athletic Conference (KCAC) is a college athletic conference affiliated with the National Association of Intercollegiate Athletics (NAIA). The KCAC is the oldest conference in the NAIA and the second oldest in the United States, tracing its history to 1890.

History
On February 15, 1890, the Kansas Intercollegiate Athletic Association was formed; it was the first successful attempt to organize Kansas colleges for the purposes of promoting and regulating amateur intercollegiate athletics. In addition to the private universities and colleges, the conference also included Kansas State Agriculture College (now Kansas State University), the University of Kansas, and Washburn University. In November of that year, the first college football game in Kansas was played between the Kansas Jayhawks and Baker University.

About 1902 the association allied with the Kansas College Athletic Conference, the first group to adopt a definite set of rules and regulations. By the 1920s the conference had changed its name to Kansas Collegiate Athletic Conference and had grown to include 17 regular members and 2 allied members (no longer including the University of Kansas or Kansas State). In 1923 seven colleges withdrew to form the Central Intercollegiate Athletic Conference.

On December 1, 1928, the Kansas Intercollegiate Athletic Conference was formally disbanded and replaced by a new Kansas College Athletic Conference which included six members and formed the present legal entity. It was commonly referred to as the "Little Six", in contrast to the Big Six Conference that eventually became the current Big 12. By 1968 the conference grew to include 12 members. It was organized into Northern and Southern divisions until 1970 when three colleges withdrew to join Missouri-based conferences. In the mid-1970s the name was changed to its current form.

1905 night game
See 1905 Cooper vs. Fairmount football game

In the 1905 season, the Coleman Company set up temporary gas-powered lighting for a night game against Cooper College (now called the Sterling Warriors). It was the first night football game played west of the Mississippi River. Fairmount (now Wichita State University) won the game 24–0.

1905 "experimental" game
See 1905 Washburn vs. Fairmount football game

On December 25, 1905, Fairmount played a game against the Washburn Ichabods using a set of experimental rules. The game was officiated by then Washburn head coach John H. Outland.

The experiment was considered a failure. Outland commented, "It seems to me that the distance required in three downs would almost eliminate touchdowns, except through fakes or flukes." The Los Angeles Times reported that there was much kicking and that the game was considered much safer than regular play, but that the new rule was not "conducive to the sport."

In his history of the sport of football, David M. Nelson concluded that "the first forward passes were thrown at the end of the 1905 season in a game between Fairmount and Washburn colleges in Kansas." According to Nelson, Washburn completed three passes, and Fairmount completed two.

Chronological timeline

 1902 – The Kansas Collegiate Athletic Conference (KCAC) was founded as the Kansas Intercollegiate Athletic Conference (KIAC). Charter members included Baker University, Bethany College, Bethel College, the College of Emporia (CoE), Cooper Memorial College (now Sterling College), Fairmount College (now Wichita State University), Friends University, Kansas Wesleyan University, Kansas State Teachers College of Emporia (now Emporia State University), Kansas State Teachers College of Hays (now Fort Hays State University), Kansas State Teachers College of Pittsburg (now Pittsburg State University), Kansas State Agricultural College (now Kansas State University), McPherson College, Ottawa University, St. Benedict's College (now Benedictine College), St. Mary's College (now Saint Mary's Academy and College), Southwest Kansas Conference College (now Southwestern College), Washburn College (now Washburn University) as full members, and St. John's College and Kansas City University as allied members, effective beginning the 1902–03 academic year.
 1913 – Kansas State left the KIAC to join the Missouri Valley Intercollegiate Athletic Association (MVIAA), effective after the 1912–13 academic year.
 1923 – Nine institutions left the KIAC to join their respective new home primary conferences: The College of Emporia, Emporia State, Fort Hays State, Pittsburg State, Southwestern (Ks.), Washburn and Wichita State to form the Central Intercollegiate Athletic Conference (CIC), and Kansas City U. and St. John's (Ks.) as Independents, effective after the 1922–23 academic year.
 1928 – Bethel (Ks.), Friends, Sterling and St. Benedict's (Ks.) left the KIAC to become Independents, effective in December 1928 (during the 1928–29 academic year).
 1928 – The KIAC has been rebranded as the Kansas College Athletic Conference (KCAC), effective in December 1928 (during the 1928–29 academic year).
 1931 – St. Mary's (Ks.) left the KCAC as the school closed, effective after the 1930–31 academic year.
 1933 – The College of Emporia re-joined back to the KCAC, effective in the 1933–34 academic year.
 1939 – Bethel (Ks.) re-joined back to the KCAC, effective in the 1939–40 academic year.
 1953 – Friends re-joined back to the KCAC, effective in the 1953–54 academic year.
 1958 – Southwestern (Ks.) and Sterling re-joined back to the KCAC, effective in the 1958–59 academic year.
 1968 – St. Mary of the Plains College and Tabor College joined the KCAC, effective in the 1968–69 academic year.
 1970 – The KCAC has been rebranded as the Kansas Collegiate Athletic Conference (KCAC), effective in the 1970–71 academic year.
 1971 – Baker, the College of Emporia and Ottawa left the KCAC to form part of the Heart of America Athletic Conference (HAAC), effective after the 1970–71 academic year.
 1982 – Ottawa re-joined back to the KCAC, effective in the 1982–83 academic year.
 1992 – St. Mary's of the Plains left the KCAC as the school closed, effective after the 1991–92 academic year.
 1999 – The Saint Mary College of Leavenworth (now the University of Saint Mary) joined the KCAC, effective in the 1999–2000 academic year.
 2015 – Oklahoma Wesleyan University joined the KCAC, effective in the 2015–16 academic year.
 2015 – Six institutions joined the KCAC as associate members: St. Gregory's University for men's lacrosse, Midland University and Johnson & Wales University–Colorado for women's lacrosse, and Clarke University and Missouri Valley College for men's and women's lacrosse (with Benedictine re-joining back for both sports), all effective in the 2016 spring season (2015–16 academic year).
 2016 – St. Gregory's left the KCAC as an associate member for men's lacrosse after the school suspended it, effective during the 2016 spring season (2015–16 academic year).
 2016 – York College joined the KCAC, effective in the 2015–16 academic year.
 2016 – St. Ambrose University joined the KCAC as an associate member for men's lacrosse, effective in the 2017 spring season (2016–17 academic year).
 2017 – Five institutions joined the KCAC as associate members: Columbia College of Missouri for men's lacrosse, St. Ambrose adding women's lacrosse to its KCAC associate membership, and Hastings College, the University of Jamestown and Missouri Baptist University for women's wrestling, all effective in the 2017–18 academic year.
 2018 – Johnson & Wales–Colorado left the KCAC as an associate member for women's lacrosse, effective after the 2018 spring season (2017–18 academic year).
 2018 – Avila University joined the KCAC, effective in the 2015–16 academic year.
 2019 – Six institutions joined the KCAC as associate members: Culver–Stockton College for women's lacrosse, Lincoln College, Morningside College (now Morningside University) and William Penn University for men's and women's swimming (with Missouri Baptist adding these sports), and Midland adding men's lacrosse and men's & women's swimming to its KCAC associate membership, all effective in the 2019–20 academic year.
 2020 – Missouri Baptist left the KCAC as an associate member for women's wrestling, effective after the 2019–20 academic year.
 2020 – Four institutions joined the KCAC as associate members: Bethel Indiana University for men's and women's swimming (with Morningside adding these sports), Cottey College for women's flag football, and Midland adding women's wrestling and women's flag football to its KCAC associate membership, all effective in the 2020–21 academic year.
 2021 – Lincoln (Ill.) left the KCAC as an associate member for men's and women's swimming, effective after the 2020–21 academic year.
 2022 – The College of Saint Mary (Neb.) joined KCAC as an associate member in women's swimming & diving effective in the 2022–23 academic year.
 2023 – Evangel University will join the KCAC, effective beginning the 2023–24 academic year.

Member schools

Current members
The KCAC currently has 13 full members, all are private schools:

Notes

Future member
The KCAC will have one future member, which will also be a private school:

Notes

Associate members
The KCAC currently has 15 associate members, all are private schools:

Notes

Former members
The KCAC had 12 former full members, all but five were private schools:

Notes

Former associate members
The KCAC had four former associate members, all were private schools:

Notes

Membership timeline

Sports

See also

List of Kansas Collegiate Athletic Conference people
2012 Kansas Collegiate Athletic Conference football season
List of college athletic programs in Kansas
Timeline of college football in Kansas

References

External links

 
1890 establishments in Kansas
College sports in Kansas
Articles which contain graphical timelines